In music notation, dal segno, often abbreviated as D.S., is used as a navigation marker. From Italian for "from the sign", D.S. appears in sheet music and instructs a musician to repeat a passage starting from the sign shown at right, sometimes called the segno in English.

Two common variants:
D.S. al coda instructs the musician to go back to the sign, and when Al coda or To coda is reached jump to the coda symbol.
D.S. al fine instructs the musician to go back to the sign, and end the piece at the measure marked fine.

Al segno indicates that the player should go to the sign. Da capo al segno (D.C. al Segno), "From the beginning to the sign (𝄋)."

In operas of the 18th century, dal segno arias were a common alternative to da capo arias which began with an opening ritornello, which was then omitted in the repeat (the sign being placed after the ritornello).

Encoding

See also
Coda
Da capo
Fermata
Repeat sign

References

Musical notation
Italian words and phrases